Giuseppe Gambarini (1680 – 11 September 1725) was an Italian painter of the late-Baroque period, active mainly in Bologna. He was a pupil of the painters Lorenzo Pasinelli and Cesare Gennari. He also painted frescoes in the Palazzo Buonaccorsi in Macerata. He is also called Gioseffo Gambarini. One of his pupils was Stefano Gherardini

A 20th-century landscape artist has the same name.

References

External links

1680 births
1725 deaths
17th-century Italian painters
Italian male painters
18th-century Italian painters
Painters from Bologna
Italian Baroque painters
18th-century Italian male artists